Ahmad Jazlan bin Yaakub (Jawi أحمد جزلان يعقوب; is a Malaysian politician who has served as Chairman of the FELCRA Berhad for the second term since March 2023 and first term from October 2021 to December 2022. He served as the Member of Parliament (MP) for Machang from May 2013 to November 2022, Deputy Minister of Rural and Regional Development II in the Barisan Nasional (BN) administration under former Prime Minister Najib Razak and former Minister Ismail Sabri Yaakob from July 2015 to the collapse of the BN administration in May 2018, Chairman of Malaysian Palm Oil Board (MPOB) from April 2020 to his resignation in January 2021 and Chairman of the National Kenaf and Tobacco Board (LKTN) from February 2015 to October 2015. He is a member, State Chairman of Kelantan and Division Chairman of Machang of the United Malays National Organisation (UMNO), a component party of the BN coalition.

Background

Family 

Ahmad Jazlan was born on 30 August 1964 in Jelawat, Bachok, Kelantan.  The son of the late Haji Yaakub bin Muhamad and the late Hajah Fatimah bint Jusoh and the third of 21 siblings, he was the eldest son in a large family.

His family moved to Machang after following his father, who served as a teacher at the time, and decided to stay in Machang after his retirement.  After his retirement, his father started a business involved in the sale of Kelantan big cars, developer, plantation and real estate lease to locals in Machang, Bachok and Kota Bharu as early as the 1980s.

Ahmad Jazlan also helped his father manage the business as young as 18 years old. At early of his career, he was often assigned to Japan and the United Kingdom to select and buy used cars, and he chose to continue running the family business to help his siblings after his father's death.  He also took on the role of head of the family to ensure that his siblings were not left out of school.

His mother was the housewife of the late family of the late Haji Yaakub bin Muhamad who devoted her entire time to taking care of household matters and raising children.

Marriage 

He established a marriage with Datin Hajjah Wan Norizan binti Wan Ismail and Datin Hajjah Noorul Ain binti Mohmad Nor with 6 kids; 3 daughters and 3 sons

Education

Ahmad Jazlan holds a Diploma in Entrepreneurship (Level 4) and an Advanced Diploma in Business Management before pursuing Master of Business Administration degree at the University of the West of Scotland with a thesis entitled Strategic Orientation in adopting an open approach to innovation on business performanceː A study on rural development.

Although in his early years he did not continue his studies to keep his younger siblings in line for education and he become the family heads after the late father passed away, he was very concerned about education and believed that only education could change our future and make a country developed.  His philosophy of life is that education will not stop as long as we breathe.

Administration Experience

Based on his experience and knowledge, Ahmad Jazlan has held several important positions in government administration, including ː

2020 – 2021 chairman, Malaysian Palm Oil Board (MPOB)

2015 – 2018 Deputy Minister, Ministry of Rural and Regional Development (KKLW)

2015 Chairman, National Kenaf and Tobacco Board (LKTN)

2013 – 2016 chairman, Kelantan State Sports Council (MSN)

2004 – 2007 President, Kelantan FA (KAFA)

Social Engagement / Non-Governmental Organizations (NGOs)

Ahmad Jazlan was very close to the community, he was also appointed by organizations for several positions including ː

2018 – is currently the Senior Assistant Commissioner of the Malaysian Prison Department

2017–present Assistant Commissioner of the Volunteer Department of Malaysia (RELA)

2017 – 2018 Mentor (Deputy Minister) of Universities Malaysia Kelantan (UMK)

2017 – 2018 Mentor (Deputy Minister) of Sultan Idris Educational University (UPSI)

2016 – currently Assistant Commissioner of the Malaysian Defense Forces (APM)

2016 – currently the Chairman of the Machang Parliament Rural Development Council

2008 – currently the Chairman of Machang Parliament's Agricultural Development Council

1996 – 2001 Chairman of Machang District Sports Council

1996 – 2001 MAYC Youth Council chairman Machang District

Engagement in politics

UMNO party

He became involved in the political landscape of Malaysia as early as age 25 to join the United Malays National Organization (UMNO) and started getting belief in the age of 31 years at the Machang. Among the positions that have been held since 1995 to date are ː

2018 – now chairman, UMNO Kelantan Liaison Committees

2018 – now UMNO Malaysian High Supreme Council (MKT) 

2008 – now the Division Chief, UMNO Machang Division

2014 – 2018 Deputy chairman, Kelantan UMNO Liaison Committees 

2004 – 2008 Acting Head of Division, UMNO Machang Division

2004 – 2004 Deputy Division Head, UMNO Machang Division

1998 – 2001 Deputy Youth Chief of State, Kelantan UMNO Liaison

1997 – 1998 State Youth Secretary of State, Kelantan UMNO Liaison

1995 – 2001 Division Youth Chief, UMNO Machang Division

Politics

Withdrawal of support for Perikatan Nasional
On 9 January 2021, he personally and publicly announced his withdrawal of support and he was no longer aligned with PN as an MP although his coalition is, resulting in a hung parliament as the PN coalition led by Prime Minister Muhyiddin Yassin lost the majority support by commanding the support of only half (110 out) of 220 MPs (at least 111) in the Dewan Rakyat, Parliament. His withdrawal of support was the second one from his coalition after the withdrawal of support of Tengku Razaleigh Hamzah (Gua Musang MP).

Elections

Ahmad Jazlan had been contesting in the 2008 Malaysian General Elections for Kemuning state assembly state. However, he was defeated. In the 2013 Malaysian General Elections, he was elected to the Machang parliamentary seat and won. Ahmad Jazlan maintains victory in the same Parliament in the 2018 Malaysian General Elections.

Election results

Honours

Honours of Malaysia 
  :
  Commander of the Order of Meritorious Service (PJN) – Datuk (2010)
 
  Knight Commander of the Order of Malacca (DCSM) – Datuk Wira (2017)
  :
  Knight Commander of the Order of the Life of the Crown of Kelantan (DJMK) – Dato' (2017)

References 

1964 births
Living people
People from Kelantan
Malaysian people of Malay descent
Malaysian Muslims
United Malays National Organisation politicians
Members of the Dewan Rakyat
21st-century Malaysian politicians
Commanders of the Order of Meritorious Service